Jack Sock was the defending champion but decided not to participate. 
Denis Kudla won the title, beating Farrukh Dustov 6–2, 6–2.

Seeds

Draw

Finals

Top half

Bottom half

References
 Main Draw
 Qualifying Draw

Nielsen Pro Tennis Championship - Singles
2014 Singles